Michael Dean Perry (born August 27, 1965) is a former American football defensive lineman and the younger brother of William Perry. His parents are Inez S. Perry and Hollie Perry, Sr. of Aiken, South Carolina.  He learned to play football from his older brothers. He attended South Aiken High School where he anchored the offensive and defensive line. He played football at Clemson University and set the school record of 28 sacks (tied by defensive end Gaines Adams in 2006 and then broken by Vic Beasley in 2014). He was later drafted by the Cleveland Browns in the second round of the 1988 NFL Draft. He played in the Pro Bowl six times and played for the Browns, the Denver Broncos, and the Kansas City Chiefs over his 10-year career.

Michael Dean Perry was one of the more televised players in Cleveland during his stay with the Browns. He also at one time had a McDonald's sandwich named in his honor. The sandwich was named the "MDP". The "MDP" was available only in the Metro Cleveland area. The sandwich at the time was larger than any offering made by McDonald's. It consisted of the same ingredients as a double cheeseburger with the addition of a patty and bacon.

References

1965 births
Living people
Sportspeople from Aiken, South Carolina
American football defensive tackles
American football defensive ends
Clemson Tigers football players
Cleveland Browns players
Denver Broncos players
Kansas City Chiefs players
American Conference Pro Bowl players